Chen Yao (born 31 October 1994) is a Chinese actress. She is known for her role as Yue Qiluo in Wu Xin: The Monster Killer (2015).

Early life
Chen Yao was born in Panzhihua, Sichuan, China. Chen graduated from the Beijing Film Academy in 2017.

Career
Chen made her acting debut in the youth sports drama Go! Goal! Fighting!, which premiered in 2016.

In 2015, Chen rose to fame for her role as Yue Qiluo, the main antagonist in the hit fantasy web series Wu Xin: The Monster Killer. Chen was awarded the Best Supporting Actress at the Golden Guduo Media Awards for her breakout performance.

In 2016, Chen was part of an ensemble cast for the drama Legend of Nine Tails Fox, in which she played a fox demon. The drama also co-starred Zhang Ruoyun and Qiao Xin. The same year, Chen starred in her first leading role in So Young, based on the youth romance novel of the same name by Xin Yiwu. The following year, she reprised her role as Yue Qiluo in the second season of Wu Xin: The Monster Killer and simultaneously portrayed a male character in the series.

In 2018, Chen starred in the fantasy historical drama Beauties in the Closet, followed by modern youth drama Meet in Youth, Love in Foods with Chen Xiang. The same year, she won the Rising Star Award at the Sina Best Taste 2017 Award Ceremony. Chen then starred in the action drama Age of Legends, in which she portrayed a young female CEO.

In 2020, the third installment of Wu Xin: The Monster Killer premiered. Chen portrayed a pair of twin siblings who had mysterious connections with Yue Qiluo. The same year, she starred in the youth sports drama My Unicorn Girl, and historical romance mystery drama Maiden Holmes. Her debut film, First Love was also released.

Filmography

Film

Television series

Variety show

Awards

References

1994 births
Living people
Beijing Film Academy alumni
Actresses from Sichuan
Chinese television actresses
21st-century Chinese actresses
Tangren Media